Macquarie County is one of the 141 Cadastral divisions of New South Wales, Australia. It is bordered to the north by the Apsley River, and to the south by the Manning River. It includes Port Macquarie and the area around it.

Macquarie County was named in honour of Governor Lachlan Macquarie (1762–1824).

Parishes within this county
A full list of parishes found within this county; their current LGA and mapping coordinates to the approximate centre of each location is as follows:

References

Counties of New South Wales
Port Macquarie